Samborski may refer to the following:

 Leszek Samborski Polish politician, Member of Parliament
 Bogusław Samborski (1897–1971), Polish actor and German collaborator
 Samoborski Otok, Samobor, Zagreb County, Croatia
 Somborski SK, a football club from Sombor, Serbia
 of or relating to Sambor a historically Polish city currently located in Ukraine

See also
 Sambor (disambiguation)
 Samborska Street, Warsaw, Poland
 Eric Semborski (born 1993), American ice hockey player
 Samborsko, Gmina Jastrowie, Złotów County, Greater Poland Voivodeship, Poland